Peregrine White ( 20 November 162020 July 1704) was the first 
baby boy born on the Pilgrim ship the Mayflower in the harbour of Massachusetts, the second baby born on the Mayflowers historic voyage, and the first known English child born to the Pilgrims in America. His parents, William White and his pregnant wife Susanna, with their son Resolved White and two servants, came on the Mayflower in 1620. Peregrine White was born while the Mayflower lay at anchor in the harbor at Cape Cod. In later life he became a person of note in Plymouth Colony, active in both military and government affairs.

English origins 
Peregrine White was the second son of Mayflower pilgrim William White and his wife Susanna White Winslow. His mother Susanna was pregnant during the Mayflower voyage and gave birth to Peregrine in late November 1620 while the ship was anchored at Cape Cod, now Provincetown Harbor.

The Whites are believed to have boarded the Mayflower as part of the London merchant group, and not as members of the Leiden Holland religious movement. Evidence of the William White family coming to the Mayflower from England and not Holland comes from William Bradford's Mayflower passenger list which has "Mr. William White" in his section for London merchants along with Christopher Martin, William Mullins, Stephen Hopkins, Richard Warren and John Billington. It is believed that if William White had been a member of the Leiden congregation, his name would have appeared in Bradford's work for that section, but it does not. There is no evidence to associate William White and his family with Leiden, Holland.
And regarding the various White family ancestries which erroneously place the William White family in them, the Mayflower Society states that "Little is known about William White."

Mayflower voyage 
The White family, as recalled by William Bradford in 1651 consisted of, "Mr. William White, and Susana, his wife, and one son, called Resolved, and one borne a ship-bord, called Peregrine; and *2* servants, named William Holbeck and Edward Thomson."

The Mayflower departed from Plymouth, England, on the 6/16 of September in 1620. The small, 100-foot ship had 102 passengers and a crew of about 30-40 in extremely cramped conditions. By the second month out the ship was being buffeted by strong westerly gales, causing the ship's timbers to be badly shaken with caulking failing to keep out sea water and with passengers, even in their berths, lying wet and ill. This, combined with a lack of proper rations and unsanitary conditions for several months, contributed to circumstances that would be fatal for many, especially the majority of women and children.  On the way there were two deaths, a crew member and a passenger, but the worst was yet to come after arriving at their destination when, in the space of several months, almost half the passengers perished in the cold, harsh, unfamiliar New England winter.

At some point along the journey, the first baby was born on the Mayflower, Oceanus Hopkins, to the passengers Stephen and Elizabeth Hopkins.

On 9/19 November 1620, after about 3 months at sea including a month of delays in England, they spotted land which was the Cape Cod Hook, now called Provincetown Harbor. After several days of trying to sail south to their planned destination of the Colony of Virginia, strong winter seas forced them to return to the harbor at Cape Cod hook, where they anchored on 11/21 November 1620. The Mayflower Compact was signed that day.

In Plymouth Colony 
Peregrine White's father William White died on the 21st of February in 1621. With her husband's death, Susanna, with her newborn son Peregrine and five-year-old Resolved, became the only surviving widow out of the many families who perished that first winter. On 12 May 1621 Peregrine's mother Susanna married widower Edward Winslow, a Mayflower and later a Plymouth colony notable with whom she had five children, one of whom was Josiah Winslow, future Plymouth governor.

In the 1627 Division of Cattle, both Resolved (sic) and his brother Peregrine were listed in the Third Lot under Capt. Standish in the family of Edward Winslow, his wife Susanna and their sons Edward and John Winslow.

In 1636, the family, now numbering 6 - Edward and Susanna, Resolved and Peregrine White, and the two children born to Edward and Susanna, Josias and Elizabeth Winslow - moved to the new settlement of Marshfield, north of Plymouth.

Peregrine served in the militia at age 16 and continued to serve, first as a lieutenant and then a captain. He was also a farmer.  At some point he also served his community as a representative to the General Court.

Death and burial 
Peregrine White died on July 20, 1704 (Old Style), in Marshfield, Massachusetts at age 83 years and 8 months. He was buried in Winslow Cemetery in Marshfield, Massachusetts. His wife Sarah died on January 22, 1711, and was also buried in Winslow Cemetery. Additionally, Peregrine's elder brother Resolved White, his wife Judith and their mother Susanna were all buried in Winslow Cemetery. Winslow Cemetery has a substantial stone monument to "The Early Settlers of Green Harbor Marshfield" naming, among others, Resolved and Peregrine White, their wives and mother Susanna as well as her second husband Edward Winslow.

Obituary 
Marshfield vital records note the death of "Capt. Peregrine White" on "July ye 20:1704" and the 'Boston Newsletter' of Monday July 31, 1704, gives the following obituary: "Marshfield, July, 22 Capt. Peregrine White of this town, Aged Eighty three years, and Eight Months; died the 20th Instant. He was vigorous and of a comly Aspect to the last; Was the Son of Mr. William White and Susanna his Wife;' born on board the Mayflower, Capt. Jones Commander, in Cape Cod Harbour. Altho' he was in the former part of his Life extravagant; yet was much Reform'd in his last years; and died hopefully."

Notes

References 
Banks, Charles Edward (2006). The English Ancestry and Homes of the Pilgrim Fathers: who came to Plymouth on the Mayflower in 1620, the Fortune in 1621, and the Anne and the Little James in 1623. Baltimore, MD: Genealogical Publishing Co.
Bowman, George Ernest (1920). The Mayflower Compact and its signers. Boston: Massachusetts Society of Mayflower Descendants.
Johnson, Caleb H. (2006). The Mayflower and Her Passengers. Indiana: Xlibris Corp.
Philbrick, Nathaniel (2006). Mayflower: A story of Courage, Community and War. New York: Viking.
Sherman, Ruth Wilder, CG, FASG and Robert Moody Sherman, CG, FASG. Re-edited by Robert S. Wakefield, FASG, Mayflower Families through Five Generations: Descendants of the Pilgrims who landed at Plymouth, Mass. December 1620. Vol. 13: Family of William White. Pub. General Society of Mayflower Descendants 2006 3rd Ed.
Stratton, Eugene Aubrey (1986). Plymouth Colony: Its History and People, 1620-1691. Salt Lake City: Ancestry Publishing.
Young, Alexander (1842). Chronicles of the Pilgrim Fathers of the Colony of Plymouth from 1620-95. Boston: Charles C. Little and James Brown.

1620 births
1704 deaths
People from Plymouth, Massachusetts
Mayflower passengers
Burials at Winslow Cemetery